Lucas da Silva Ribeiro Campos (born 30 October 1997) is a Brazilian footballer who plays as a forward for Valletta.

Career statistics

Club

References

External links
Botafogo profile 

1997 births
Living people
People from Nova Iguaçu
Brazilian footballers
Association football forwards
Campeonato Brasileiro Série A players
Expatriate footballers in Malta
Botafogo de Futebol e Regatas players
Nova Iguaçu Futebol Clube players
Clube Atlético Tubarão players
Valletta F.C. players
Sportspeople from Rio de Janeiro (state)